Kamogawa Sea World is a large scale comprehensive marine leisure center/museum equivalent facility located between the Tojo coast and the national highway No. 128 in Kamogawa city, Chiba Prefecture, Japan. It is not affiliated with SeaWorld in any way and is operated by Granvista Hotels & Resorts Co., Ltd. it is a public aquarium and is also a member of Japanese Association of Zoos and Aquariums (JAZA). In 2021, the park celebrated the 50th anniversary of its opening.

History 

In October 1970, Yasushi Tourism Corporation launched a business. The park focused on marine animal exhibitions such as dolphins and sea lions, with breeding and training programs for orcas. There are now performances by marine animals other than killer whales. There are three different zones: the Eco Aquaroam, Tropical Island, and Rocky world, which contains most of the sea creatures, with about 11,000 on display.

By the opening of Sea World, resort hotels such as "Kamogawa Grand Tower" and ryokan / recreation facilities were built in the Kamogawa area, which was a sightseeing area until then, south Boso was transformed into a resort for a whole year. In addition, the hotel "Kamogawa Sea World Hotel" managed directly inside Sea World premises, was founded in 1971.

Since Yasu Tourism was absorbed and merged into Mitsui Kohmura (former North Coast Tourism, now Gran Vista) in 1986, it became the main facility of the company. In 1987, a new establishment of the Ocean Stadium which can accommodate about 2,000 people exclusively for orca performance, Eco Equalome which renewed indoor aquarium panolium in December 1996, Rocky World and Seika Performance only for July 1998 "The Rocky Stadium (about 1,000 people)" has been established, July 2001 has expanded the exhibition facilities, the tropical island to display the fishes in the South Pacific and the sea turtle beach new construction.

As a countermeasure for COVID-19, the number of visitors was restricted from July 23 to August 30, 2020.

Research and conservation 

So far, aquarium has succeeded in breeding fish and sea turtles. During 2003, a total of nine killer whales, walruses, Caspian seals, steller sea lions (two), California sea lions (two), and bottlenose dolphins (two) were born. In addition, the ocean sunfish named Kukey, who started captivity in 1982, set a world record for captivity for 2,993 days, living for eight years. About 1-3 California sea lions are born every two years. In the past, steller sea lions gave birth at the same pace as other sea lions, but it seems that there are no plans for a while because the male "Nosa" died in 2007.

The creatures that have received the Japanese Association of Zoos and Aquariums (JAZA) Breeding Award are as follows. Pictures of the plates and the award-winning creatures are on display in the Eco Equalome.

 Thorny seahorse
 Clownfish
 Australian Sea Lion-World's first non-Australian facility
 Walrus
 Northern sea lion
 California sea lion
 Killer whale-"Lovey"
 Caspian Seal-"Kapi"
 Bottlenose dolphin-artificial insemination (5th case in the world)
 Asian sheepshead wrasse
 Banded pipefish

Killer whales 
After December 2015, "Lovey" (female, born January 11, 1998), "Lara" (female, born February 8, 2001), "Run" (female, born February 25, 2006), "Luna" (Female, born on July 19, 2012). Lovey, Lara, and Ran are sisters, and Luna is Lovey's daughter. In addition, three surviving families (Stella, Earth, and Lynn) are bred at the Port of Nagoya Public Aquarium.

Killer whales birth
Although killer whales have been bred since the opening of the aquarium, it was not until 1995 that they were able to give birth. "Maggie (female)" gave birth on March 3, but died in just 30 minutes due to her breech birth. The second child, who gave birth on October 5, 1997, died that day, and Maggie died two days later. This is not well known now because another killer whale gave birth later, but an FRP replica of the bred individual is displayed on the first basement floor of Rocky World as a "newborn killer whale" with a bulleted explanation plate.

Breeding was confirmed between "Stella (female)" and "Bingo (male)" in 1997, and in January 1998, the first child was successfully born and was named "Lovie" and won the breeding award. It is said that this feat further increased the name recognition of Kamogawa Sea World and the number of visitors remained steady. Later, in the same pair, a total of four children (all females) were born, "Lara" in 2001, "Sara" (died in 2006) in 2003, and "Ran" in 2006, and they are playing an active part in the performance. .. In October 2008, a third-generation individual, "Earth (male)," was born between a 10-year-old Lovie and an estimated 23-year-old "Oscar (male)." From the same pair, "Luna (female)" was also born in July 2012.

Facility 

Aquarium 
Ocean Stadium
Surf Stadium
Marine Theater
Rocky Stadium
Eco aquaroam
Rocky Stadium
Eco aquaroam
Tropical Island
Rocky World
Polar Adventure
Pirika Forest
Sea Turtle Beach
Pelican Pond
Steller Sea Lion Sea
Sea Lion and Seal Sea
Walrus Sea
Penguin Sea
Dolphin Sea
Source:

Restaurant 
Restaurant Ocean
Food Court Mauri
Buffet Restaurant Sun Cruise

Gift shop
Gift Shop Marine Market
Bazaar Court Raoi

Accommodation
Kamogawa Sea World Hotel
Source:

See also
 List of captive orcas
 Captive killer whales

References

External links
 

Aquaria in Japan
1970 establishments in Japan
Amusement parks opened in 1970
Amusement parks in Japan
Tourist attractions in Chiba Prefecture
Kamogawa, Chiba